Gradnik is a village in the Municipality of Semič in Slovenia. The area is part of the historical region of Lower Carniola. The municipality is now included in the Southeast Slovenia Statistical Region.

Mass grave
Gradnik is the site of a mass grave from the Second World War. It contains the remains of four to six people killed by the Partisans in October 1943.

Church
The local church is dedicated to Saint Nicholas and belongs to Parish of Semič. It was first mentioned in written documents dating to 1523 and was restyled in the Baroque in the 18th century.

References

External links
Gradnik at Geopedia

Populated places in the Municipality of Semič